Michael Wengren (born September 3, 1971) is an American drummer, best known for his work with heavy metal band Disturbed. He is one of the founding members of the band, which was formed in 1994. Wengren is known for his bass drum techniques that have become a staple of Disturbed's music.

Biography 
Born and raised in Chicago, Illinois, Wengren has been playing drums since around the age of 10. He attended Curie High School on the Southwest side of Chicago.

He has been quoted as saying that Metallica, Slayer, Judas Priest, Testament, Mötley Crüe, Pantera, Iron Maiden, and Racer X were his strongest influences.

On August 31, 2005, before the set closed, frontman David Draiman handed the microphone to Wengren, who invited his girlfriend onstage and proposed marriage to her.

In 2013, Wengren pursued a side project band, Fight or Flight, in collaboration with Disturbed member Dan Donegan. In 2020, Wengren became a partial owner of Steel Tank Brewing Company in Oconomowoc, Wisconsin.

Endorsements 
In recent years, Wengren has appeared in advertisements for Pearl Drums, since the Masters Series was his first professional kit purchased from Midwest Percussion the early 1990s. Wengren uses Evans Hydraulic Glass drumheads on all toms and EQ3 heads on both bass drums. He has been added to the Vater Signature line of drumsticks, which now has a Mike Wengren model. Additionally, he uses Sabian cymbals.

His previous tour kit was a 'cranberry fade' Pearl MRX Masters Series drumset with black hardware. Wengren's tour kit in support of the album Ten Thousand Fists was a 'vintage sunburst' variation of the same drumset, also with black hardware.

Discography

Brawl 
Demo Tape (1994)

Disturbed 
The Sickness (2000)
Believe (2002)
Ten Thousand Fists (2005)
Indestructible (2008)
Asylum (2010)
The Lost Children (2011)
Immortalized (2015)
Evolution (2018)
Divisive (2022)

Fight or Flight 
 A Life by Design? (2013)

Other appearances 
"Let the Truth Be Known" (2008)
"A Song for Chi" (2009)

Awards and nominations 

Loudwire Music Awards

|-
| 2015 || Mike Wengren || Best Drummer ||

References

External links 

Disturbed's official website
Fight or Flight's official website
Vater Drumsticks

1971 births
Living people
Musicians from Chicago
Nu metal drummers
Disturbed (band) members
American heavy metal drummers
20th-century American drummers
American male drummers
21st-century American drummers